Mississippi Hills National Heritage Area is a federally designated National Heritage Area in the northeastern portion of the U.S. state of Mississippi. The designation commemorates the region's impact on American culture and its role in the American Civil War and the American civil rights movement. The national heritage area designation provides a unified marketing and promotion framework for the area.

The national heritage area covers all of Marshall, Benton, Tippah, Alcorn, Tishomingo, Lafayette, Union, Pontotoc, Lee, Itawamba, Calhoun, Chickasaw and Monroe counties, and those portions of Desoto, Tate, Panola, Yalobusha, Grenada and Montgomery counties to the east of Interstate 55 and north of Mississippi Highway 14. Significant sites within the national heritage area include Brice's Crossroads National Battlefield and the birthplace of Elvis Presley. 

Mississippi Hills National Heritage Area was established by the Omnibus Public Land Management Act of 2009.

References

External links
 Mississippi Hills National Heritage Area official website

National Heritage Areas of the United States
2009 establishments in Mississippi
Protected areas established in 2009
Protected areas of Marshall County, Mississippi
Protected areas of Benton County, Mississippi
Protected areas of Tippah County, Mississippi
Protected areas of Alcorn County, Mississippi
Protected areas of Tishomingo County, Mississippi
Protected areas of Lafayette County, Mississippi
Protected areas of Union County, Mississippi
Protected areas of Pontotoc County, Mississippi
Protected areas of Lee County, Mississippi
Protected areas of Itawamba County, Mississippi
Protected areas of Calhoun County, Mississippi
Protected areas of Chickasaw County, Mississippi
Protected areas of Monroe County, Mississippi
Protected areas of DeSoto County, Mississippi
Protected areas of Tate County, Mississippi
Protected areas of Panola County, Mississippi
Protected areas of Yalobusha County, Mississippi
Protected areas of Grenada County, Mississippi
Protected areas of Montgomery County, Mississippi